Lucas González (born 25 July 1997) is an Argentine professional footballer who plays as a forward for Deportivo Madryn.

Career
González, after featuring in the club's youth set-up either side of a stint with Almirante Brown, started his senior career with San Martín of the Primera División. He made his bow in senior football in March 2019, coming off the substitutes bench in a Copa Argentina encounter with Primera B Nacional's Agropecuario on seventy-four minutes before going on to score nine minutes later in an eventual 2–2 draw; with San Martín advancing on penalties, despite González missing his spot-kick.

In January 2022, González moved to Defensores de Belgrano. Six months later, in June 2022, he signed for Deportivo Madryn.

Career statistics
.

References

External links

1997 births
Living people
Sportspeople from Tucumán Province
Argentine footballers
Association football forwards
San Martín de Tucumán footballers
Defensores de Belgrano footballers
Deportivo Madryn players